Riders of the North is a 1931 American pre-Code Western film directed by J.P. McGowan and starring Bob Custer, Blanche Mehaffey and Eddie Dunn.

Cast
 Bob Custer as Mountie Sergeant Stone 
 Blanche Mehaffey as Ann 
 Eddie Dunn as Tim 'Mac' McGuire 
 Will Walling as Inspector Devlin 
 Frank Rice as The Parson 
 George Regas as Leclerc 
 Robert 'Buddy' Shaw as Tom - Ann's Brother 
 George Hackathorne as Henchman Canuck Joe 
 Carl Deloro as Henchman Charley 
 Al Ferguson as Constable Jones

Plot
A Mountie's search for his partner's killer initially leads him to suspect the wrong man. Eventually an unexpected source helps to uncover the true killers.

References

Bibliography
 Michael R. Pitts. Poverty Row Studios, 1929–1940: An Illustrated History of 55 Independent Film Companies, with a Filmography for Each. McFarland & Company, 2005.

External links
 

1931 films
1931 Western (genre) films
American Western (genre) films
Films directed by J. P. McGowan
Films set in Canada
1930s English-language films
1930s American films